Bearing the Cross: Martin Luther King, Jr., and the Southern Christian Leadership Conference is a 1986 book by David J. Garrow about Martin Luther King Jr., the Southern Christian Leadership Conference, and the American Civil Rights Movement. The book won the 1987 Pulitzer Prize for Biography.

Bearing the Cross was published by William Morrow and Company, with a HarperCollins paperback in 2004.

References

1986 non-fiction books
Pulitzer Prize for Biography or Autobiography-winning works
Books about African-American history
Works about Martin Luther King Jr.
American biographies
History books about the United States
Books about activists
Books by David Garrow